Michael Sean Mahoney (June 30, 1939 – July 23, 2008) was a historian of science and technology.

Mahoney was born in New York City, and did his undergraduate studies at Harvard University, graduating in 1960. He earned a Ph.D. in history and history of science from Princeton University in 1967, and immediately took a position as an assistant professor there. He remained at Princeton for over 40 years, until his death in 2008.

A conference on the history of science and technology was held in his honor at Princeton in May 2009.

Fermat biography

Mahoney's biography of Pierre de Fermat received much critical attention including a scathing review by André Weil in 1973.  A second edition of Mahoney's book came out in 1994.

Selected publications

Mahoney, Michael Sean, The mathematical career of Pierre de Fermat. Princeton University Press, Princeton, N.J., 1973. 2nd edition, 1994, 
Mahoney, Michael S., Barrow's mathematics: between ancients and moderns. Before Newton, 179–249, Cambridge Univ. Press, Cambridge, 1990.
Mahoney, Michael, S. and Thomas Haigh (editor). Histories of Computing. Harvard Univ. Press. 2011.  Completed posthumously.

References

External links
 Michael S. Mahoney papers. Charles Babbage Institute, University of Minnesota. 38 boxes of Mahoney's books and serials related to the history of computing, mathematics, and related fields; and 17 boxes of Mahoney's archival materials, including course work, subject files, and publication drafts.

1939 births
2008 deaths
Harvard University alumni
Princeton University alumni
Princeton University faculty
Educators from New York City
Historians from New York (state)
Historians of science
Historians of technology